The 2004–05 season was Yeovil Town Football Club's second season in the Football League. It was also the season in which they gained promotion to the third tier of English football for the first time in their history.

Season summary 
The 2004–05 season was the club's second season in the Football League and manager Gary Johnson's fourth season in charge. Although they lost their first game of the season away to Bury, they started the season fairly well and were top of League Two with 10 games played. Despite going the next 5 league games without a win, a run of 10 league wins out of a possible 11 left them top of the table and 8 points clear of 4th placed Southend United. Yeovil also had some success in the FA Cup, setting up a 4th round tie away to Charlton Athletic, after defeating Darlington, Histon and Rotherham United in earlier rounds. Town were defeated 3–2 by Charlton in a close contest where Yeovil had a shot cleared off the line in the later stages of the game. Yeovil picked up 31 points from a possible 60 after this point, but it was enough for them to secure the title, finishing five points above 4th placed Southend United. The Glovers scored 90 goals, 21 more than any other team whilst Striker Phil Jevons was League Two's top scorer. At the end of the season, the club released five players including Latvian international Andrejs Štolcers while Polish striker Bartosz Tarachulski rejected the club's offer of a new contract.

Transfers

In

Out

Loan in

Match results

League Two

League table

FA Cup

League Cup

Football League Trophy

Squad statistics 
Source:

Numbers in parentheses denote appearances as substitute.
Players with squad numbers struck through and marked  left the club during the playing season.
Players with names in italics and marked * were on loan from another club for the whole of their season with Yeovil.
Players listed with no appearances have been in the matchday squad but only as unused substitutes.
Key to positions: GK – Goalkeeper; DF – Defender; MF – Midfielder; FW – Forward

Footnotes 

A.  Yeovil Town won 3–2 after extra time.
B.  Torquay United won 4–3 after extra time.

See also 
 2004–05 in English football
 List of Yeovil Town F.C. seasons

References 

2004–05 Football League Two by team
2004-05